Barker Fairley,  (May 21, 1887 – October 11, 1986) was a British-Canadian painter, and scholar who made a significant contribution to the  study of German literature, particularly for the work of Goethe, and was an early champion and friend of the Group of Seven.

Life and work
Although educated and brought up in a strong European tradition and background, Fairley's important life's scholarship in German literature and art criticism was done in Canada and was about Canadian art and Canadian culture.  His perspective and writings strongly influenced a burgeoning academic and artistic culture in his new chosen home.

He was born in Barnsley, Yorkshire and died, a Canadian citizen, in his home in Toronto, Ontario, Canada.

He was educated at Leeds, and in 1907 was granted a Ph.D. from Jena University in Germany. His first academic appointment was at Jena. Between 1910 and 1915, he joined the faculty at the newly founded University of Alberta in Edmonton. He joined the University of Toronto's German department in 1915 where he taught until the end of his career as a professor.

In 1949, he was invited to Bryn Mawr College to deliver lectures on the German poet Johann Wolfgang von Goethe, but was barred entry by the U.S. Department of Justice. He later compiled the texts of the abortive lectures into six essays on Faust. He retired in 1957.

In 1978, he was made an Officer of the Order of Canada for his "unique contribution to Canadian scholarship".

Barker Fairley spent almost all of his professional artistic life in Ontario, where he was also mentor and teacher to Charles Meanwell and Vincent Thomas.  Many of his paintings are still owned by the University of Toronto and are in the Art Museum, University of Toronto, Hart House collection. He began to paint in 1931 through the encouragement of Robert Finch. In his use of colour and form, the effect of the Group of Seven is quite evident. His critical approach and activism regarding the Group of Seven contributed to their acceptance in Canadian Art, and his scholarly influence over University College at the University of Toronto left a strong and lasting impression.

His first wife, Margaret Fairley, was a notable Canadian political activist. His daughter Ann (Fairley) Schabas was dean of the Faculty of Library and Information Science at the University of Toronto.  Her husband is musician Ezra Schabas, former dean of the Royal Conservatory of Music in Toronto. Barker Fairley's grandchildren include academics William Schabas, Margaret Schabas, and lawyer Paul Schabas.

Quotes

Other honours 
 Royal Canadian Academy of Arts

References

Bibliography

External links
 The People vs. Barker and Margaret Fairley
 Barker Fairley at The Canadian Encyclopedia
 Paul Dorsey, "The Quite Remarkable Barker Fairley", Dali House Art Blog, December 2008

1887 births
1986 deaths
Officers of the Order of Canada
Academic staff of the University of Alberta
Academic staff of the University of Toronto
Members of the Royal Canadian Academy of Arts
Corresponding Fellows of the British Academy